Dhandhaniya is a village in Jodhpur district, Rajasthan, India.

References

Villages in Jodhpur district